KHIM (97.7 FM) is a radio station licensed to Mangum, Oklahoma. The station broadcasts a classic hits format and is owned by Fuchs Radio L.L.C.

Previous logo

References

External links

HIM
Classic hits radio stations in the United States